The 1944 Louisiana gubernatorial election was held in two rounds on January 18 and February 29, 1944.   Like most Southern states between the Reconstruction Era and the Civil Rights Movement, Louisiana's Republican Party was virtually nonexistent in terms of electoral support.  This meant that the two Democratic Party primaries held on these dates were the real contest over who would be governor.  The 1944 election saw the reformer ‘anti-Long’ faction retain power for another four years under Jimmie Davis.

Louisiana's constitution did not allow incumbent governor Sam Jones to succeed himself in a consecutive term.  Instead, the reformer forces endorsed Jimmie Davis, a country singer from Shreveport who was then serving as Public Service Commissioner.  Davis campaigned on a theme of "Peace and Harmony", and punctuated his campaign stops with performances of "You Are My Sunshine."

Louisiana's Longite faction desired a return to power after being defeated in 1940.  Huey Long's brother Earl had ambitions to return as governor, and began to prepare for a campaign.  But Long failed to gain the support of New Orleans mayor Robert Maestri, whose Old Regular machine was seen as an essential component of any victorious Longite candidate.  Instead, Maestri threw his support behind Lewis L. Morgan, an elderly politician from Covington whose unexciting campaign found little resonance with voters.  Long had to satisfy himself with running for Lieutenant Governor on Morgan's ticket.

Other candidates included Jimmy Morrison of Hammond, Dudley J. LeBlanc of Vermilion Parish, Vincent Moseley, State Senator Ernest S. Clements of Oberlin, the seat of Allen Parish, and Shreveport Mayor Sam Caldwell. Coming amid the grim mood of wartime, the 1944 campaign was widely seen as one of the quietest in years.

Results of First Primary 

LeBlanc and Morrison each won a handful of parishes in their respective bases in south Louisiana.  Morgan did poorly in much of the state aside from the Long stronghold of Winn Parish and the surrounding area, but the number of votes turned out for him by the Old Regulars in New Orleans propelled him into the runoff.  But Davis's popularity in north Louisiana and throughout the state's rural parishes gave him a strong lead.

Results of Second Primary 

In the second primary, Morgan maintained much of his support, but Davis was able to pick up many of the votes of candidates defeated in the first primary, particularly in south Louisiana and New Orleans.  Davis won with a comfortable majority and became governor.

Sources 
Michael L. Kurtz and Morgan D. Peoples.   Earl K. Long:  The Saga of Uncle Earl and 	Louisiana Politics, 1990.

Louisiana Secretary of State.   Compilation of Primary Election Results of the Democratic Party of the State of Louisiana, 1944.

Gubernatorial
1944
Louisiana
January 1944 events
February 1944 events